Sybil Marjory Atteck (3 February 1911 − 15 April 1975) was a pioneering Trinidadian painter known for her work in watercolor, oils, ceramics, acrylics and mixed media. She is celebrated as Trinidad and Tobago's "first outstanding female painter", "first Great Woman Painter", and was the inspiration for, and a founding member, of the Trinidad Art Society, now known as The Art Society of Trinidad and Tobago, the oldest established art organization in the Caribbean.

Biography
Sybil Atteck was born on the 3rd of February, 1911 on her grandfather's cocoa estate at Tableland, Princes Town Region, South Trinidad. The Atteck family moved to Rio Claro in 1913 to the family's new home near the Rio Claro Junction. Two miles east of Rio Claro the Atteck family owned a large cocoa estate that was the prime source of income for the family. The family were actively involved in artistic endeavors with the encouragement of their mother. The elder Atteck daughters were home schooled in Rio Claro.  Atteck moved with her two elder sisters to Port of Spain when she was 12 years old to attend formal school. There, she attended Bishop Anstey High School, graduating in 1928, and became involved in numerous artistic pursuits, with the encouragement of her grandmother. In 1928 she joined the Botanical Department of the Ministry of Agriculture, where she began to produce scientific drawings of flowers. Some of these were exhibited by the Society of Trinidad Independents in 1930.

In 1934, Atteck travelled to England, to study at the Regent Street Polytechnic in London. Upon her return to Trinidad she resumed her former position. Atteck travelled again to study, in 1943, when she attended the School of Fine Arts, Washington University, and again in 1948, when she entered the Escuela de Bellas Artes in Lima. During the former sojourn she studied with Max Beckmann, whose ideas were to have a profound effect on her work. In Peru she studied the pottery of the Inca, a form that she found related to the pre-Columbian art of the Caribbean with which she was familiar.

Stylistically, Atteck remained an expressionist for much of her career, which opened her to charges of being "un-Trinidadian". Nevertheless, she exerted a great deal of influence on her contemporaries; Carlisle Chang, Willi Chen, Leo Glasgow, Althea McNish and Nina Squires are among the artists influenced by her work. In 1943 Atteck was a founding member of the Art Society of Trinidad and Tobago.

Having begun treatment for cancer in 1969, Atteck died in 1975.

Legacy
In April 2011 the exhibition Women and Art — A Journey to the Past, Perspectives on the Future that opened at Trinidad's National Museum and Art Gallery, marking 100 years of International Women’s Day, was dedicated to Sybil Atteck on the centenary of her birth, and her painting Indian Festival was reproduced on the catalogue cover.

References

Further reading
Veerle Poupeye, Caribbean Art, London: Thames and Hudson, 1998, .

Online images
An online catalog of all of Sybil's known works is now available.

1911 births
1975 deaths
Trinidad and Tobago people of Chinese descent
20th-century Trinidad and Tobago painters
People from Mayaro–Rio Claro
20th-century women artists
Women watercolorists
Trinidad and Tobago watercolourists
Trinidad and Tobago women artists